Pakuh-e Sefid (also Romanized as Pākūh-e Sefīd) is a village in Dalfard Rural District, Sarduiyeh District, Jiroft County, Kerman Province, Iran. At the 2006 census, its population was 43, in 10 families.

References 

Populated places in Jiroft County